Natal bottlebrush is a common name for several plants and may refer to:

Greyia radlkoferi, native to South Africa
Greyia sutherlandii, endemic to South Africa